Ulfa Silpiana (born 8 March 1997) is an Indonesian sprinter. She competed in the women's 200 metres at the 2017 World Championships in Athletics.

References

External links

1997 births
Living people
Indonesian female sprinters
World Athletics Championships athletes for Indonesia
Place of birth missing (living people)
Athletes (track and field) at the 2018 Asian Games
Asian Games competitors for Indonesia
21st-century Indonesian women